Wiesen may refer to:

 Wiesen, Switzerland, part of the city of Davos
 Wiesen (Rhaetian Railway station)
 Wiesen Viaduct, a railway viaduct
 Wiesen, Bavaria, a community
 Wiesen, Austria, a village
 Wiesen (Bad Staffelstein), a borough of the town of Bad Staffelstein
 Wiesen (restaurant), a Michelin starred restaurant in Eindhoven, The Netherlands
 Wiesen (surname)

See also
 Wiesensee, an artificial lake in the Westerwald mountain range of Germany